The Two Knights Defense is a chess opening that begins with the moves:
1. e4 e5
2. Nf3 Nc6
3. Bc4 Nf6

First recorded by Giulio Cesare Polerio (c. 1550 – c. 1610) in the late 16th century, this line of the Italian Game was extensively developed in the 19th century. Black's third move is a more aggressive defense than the Giuoco Piano (3...Bc5). Black allows White to attack his f7-pawn with 4.Ng5. If White does so, the game quickly takes on a tactical character: Black is practically forced to give up a pawn for the initiative. The complications are such that David Bronstein suggested that the term "defense" does not fit, and that the name "Chigorin Counterattack" would be more appropriate. The Two Knights has been adopted as Black by many aggressive players including Mikhail Chigorin and Paul Keres, and world champions Mikhail Tal and Boris Spassky. In modern grandmaster play, 3.Bc4 is less common than 3.Bb5, and the more solid 3...Bc5 is the most frequent reply, so the Two Knights Defense is infrequently seen. It remains popular with amateur players. The theory of this opening has been explored extensively in correspondence chess by players such as Hans Berliner and Yakov Estrin.

Main variations

4.Ng5

Despite Tarrasch's criticism, 4.Ng5 has remained a popular choice for White at all levels.

Main line: 4...d5 
After 4...d5 White has little option but to play 5.exd5, since both the bishop and e4-pawn are attacked.  Then Black usually plays 5...Na5 but there are other options:
 The recapture 5...Nxd5 is extremely risky. Albert Pinkus tried to bolster this move with analysis in 1943 and 1944 issues of Chess Review, but White gets a strong attack with either the safe Lolli Attack 6.d4 or the sacrificial Fried Liver (or Fegatello) Attack  6.Nxf7 Kxf7 7.Qf3+ Ke6 8.Nc3. These variations are usually considered too difficult for Black to defend , but they are sometimes used in correspondence play. Lawrence Trent describes 5...Nxd5 as "a well-known bad move" (or words to that effect).
 The Fritz Variation 5...Nd4 and Ulvestad's Variation 5...b5 are related as they share a common subvariation. American master Olav Ulvestad introduced 5...b5 in a 1941 article in Chess Review. White has only one good reply: 6.Bf1!, protecting g2 so White can answer 6...Qxd5 with 7.Nc3. Both replies 6.Bxb5 Qxd5 7.Bxc6+ Qxc6 and 6.dxc6 bxc4 7.Nc3 are weak for White. Black's best response is to transpose to the Fritz Variation with 6...Nd4, making another advantage of 6.Bf1 apparent—the bishop is not attacked as it would be if White had played 6.Be2. German master Alexander Fritz (1857–1932) suggested 5...Nd4 to Carl Schlechter, who wrote about the idea in a 1904 issue of Deutsche Schachzeitung. In 1907 Fritz himself wrote an article about his move in the Swedish journal Tidskrift för Schack. White's best reply is 6.c3, when the game often continues 6...b5 7.Bf1 Nxd5 8.Ne4 or 8.h4.

After 5...Na5, the Polerio Defense, Paul Morphy would play to hold the gambit pawn with 6.d3, the Kieseritzky Attack (or Morphy Variation), which has not been popular, since it has long been known that Black obtains good chances for the pawn with 6...h6 7.Nf3 e4 8.Qe2 Nxc4 9.dxc4 Bc5. (Bronstein once tried the piece sacrifice 8.dxe4!? with success, but its soundness is doubtful.)

Instead, White usually plays 6.Bb5+, when play usually continues 6...c6 (6...Bd7 is also possible) 7.dxc6 bxc6 8.Be2 h6. (The move 8.Qf3, popular in the nineteenth century and revived by Efim Bogoljubov in the twentieth, can be played instead; Black may reply with 8...h6, 8...Rb8, or 8...Be7.) White then has a choice of retreats for the knight. The usual move here is 9.Nf3, after which Black obtains some initiative after 9...e4 10.Ne5 Bd6 (see diagram). This is the Knorre Variation, and is considered to be the main line of the Two Knights Defense. After ten moves, White has developed only two pieces against Black's three pieces and pawns, but has an extra pawn as well as a better pawn structure. Both 11.d4 and 11.f4 have been tried here with no definitive conclusion. 10...Bc5 is a viable alternative for Black, as is 10...Qc7 (the Goring Variation).

Steinitz favored 9.Nh3 instead, although it did not bring him success in his famous 1891 cable match against Chigorin. The Steinitz Variation was mostly forgotten until Fischer revived it in the 1960s. Nigel Short led a second revival of 9.Nh3 in the 1990s, and today it is thought to be about equal in strength to the more common 9.Nf3. In addition to the moves 8.Be2 and 8.Qf3, the move 8.Bd3 is a valid alternative that has apparently become fashionable in recent years.

Traxler Variation: 4...Bc5 

This bold move ignores White's attack on f7 and leads to wild play.  Czech problemist Karel Traxler played it against Reinisch in Prague in 1890. Later it was named after Wilkes-Barre, Pennsylvania by Frank Marshall, who claimed to be first to analyze and publish it, so today 4...Bc5 is known as both the Traxler Variation and (in the United States and the United Kingdom only) the Wilkes-Barre Variation.

White can play 5.d4, 5.Nxf7, or 5.Bxf7+: 
 After 5.d4 d5!, White's best move is 6.Bxd5, reapplying the pressure on f7.
 5.Nxf7 is very complicated after 5...Bxf2+. The current main lines all are thought to lead to drawn or equal positions, e.g. after 6.Kxf2 Nxe4+ 7.Kg1, or even 7.Ke3.
 White's best try for an advantage is probably 5.Bxf7+ Ke7 6.Bb3 (although 6.Bd5 was the move recommended by Lawrence Trent), as this poses Black the most problems. No grandmasters have regularly adopted the Wilkes-Barre as Black, but Alexander Beliavsky and Alexei Shirov have played it occasionally even in top competition. No clear refutation is known. A tricky variation is 5.Bxf7+ Kf8!?, where Black plays for one last trick with 6.Bb3 d6 7.Nf7 Qe7. If White plays the seemingly standard 8.Nxh8??, Black is now winning after 8...Bg4!! 9.f3 Nxe4, making use of the pinned f3-pawn. This pawn cannot capture the bishop as 10.fxg4?? Qh4+ 11.g3 Bf2+ wins by force for Black.

4...Nxe4
4...Nxe4?! is considered unsound but must be handled carefully. 5.Nxe4 d5 poses no problems for Black. If 5.Nxf7? Qh4! 6.g3 (6.0-0 Bc5!) 6...Qh3 7.Nxh8 Qg2 8.Rf1 Nd4 9.Qh5+ g6 10.Nxg6 hxg6 11.Qxg6+ Kd8 and Black has dangerous threats. (Alternatively, after 5.Nxf7? Qh4! 6.g3, Black could play more aggressively 6...Nxg3! 7.fxg3 Qe4+ 8.Qe2 Qxh1+ 9.Qf1 Qxf1+ 10.Kxf1 d5 11.Bxd5 Bh3+ 12.Ke1 Nb4 13.Bb3 Nxc2+ 14.Bxc2 Kxf7 with a distinct advantage of material for Black.) 
Correct is 5.Bxf7+! Ke7 6.d4! (6.d3 is also good) and now: 
 6...d5 7.Nc3! (best, discovered by Soviet player Lopukhin; White has a clear advantage) 7...Nxc3 8.bxc3 Qd6 (8...Bf5 9.Qf3; 8...e4 9.f3!) 9.a4! Kd8 10.Bg8! Ke8 11.Bxh7± (Estrin).
 6...h6 7.Nxe4 Kxf7 and now 8.dxe5 Qe8 9.f4 d6 10.0-0 Kg8 11.Nbc3 dxe5 12. f5 Qf7 13.Nd5 Bd7 14.f6 g6 15.Ne7+! and White has excellent chances (Estrin).

4.d4
White can choose to  rapidly with 4.d4 exd4 5.0-0. The Nakhmanson Gambit 6.Nc3 gives White compensation if Black accepts the piece with 6...dxc3 7.Bxf7+ Kxf7 8.Qd5+, but Victor Bologan suggests 6...Nxc3 7.bxc3 d5 8.Bb5 Be7 leading to a better position for Black. Alternatively, Black can enter the extensively analyzed Max Lange Attack after 5...Bc5 6.e5 d5, which can also arise by transposition from the Giuoco Piano or Scotch Game. White can choose to avoid these lines by playing 5.e5, a line often adopted by Sveshnikov. After 5.e5, either 5...Ne4 or 5...Ng4 is a  reply, but most common and natural is 5...d5 6.Bb5 Ne4 7.Nxd4 Bc5, with  play. The tricky 5.Ng5?! is best met by 5...d5! 6.exd5 Qe7+!

Modern Bishop's Opening: 4.d3 
The quiet move 4.d3, the Modern Bishop's Opening, transposes into the Giuoco Pianissimo if Black responds 4...Bc5, but there are also independent variations after 4...Be7 or 4...h6. White tries to avoid the tactical battles that are common in other lines of the Two Knights and to enter a more positional game. The resulting positions take on some characteristics of the Ruy Lopez if White plays c3 and retreats the bishop to c2 via Bc4–b3–c2. This move became popular in the 1980s and has been used by John Nunn and others.

Four Knights Variation: 4.Nc3 
The attempt to defend the pawn with 4.Nc3 does not work well since Black can take the pawn anyway and use a fork trick to regain the piece, 4.Nc3?! Nxe4! 5.Nxe4 d5. Instead, 4.Nc3 is usually played with the intent to gambit the e-pawn with the Boden–Kieseritzky Gambit, 4.Nc3 Nxe4 5.0-0. This gambit is not commonly seen in tournament play as it is not well regarded by opening theory, but it can offer White good practical chances, especially in blitz chess.

Chess opening theory table

White must respond to the attack on the e-pawn. (For explanation of notation, see chess opening theory table.)
1. e4 e5 2. Nf3 Nc6 3. Bc4 Nf6

References

Bibliography

Further reading

External links

Harding, Tim (March 2001). The Kibitzer: Two Knights Defense, Part 1 (PDF). Chesscafe.com.
Harding, Tim (April 2001). The Kibitzer: Two Knights Defense, Part 2 (PDF). Chesscafe.com.
Harding, Tim (May 2001). The Kibitzer: Two Knights Defense, Part 3 (PDF). Chesscafe.com.

Chess openings
16th century in chess